Stop Climate Chaos is a climate change coalition of environmental and international development nongovernmental organizations (NGOs) that was formed in September 2005. The coalition ran the "I Count" campaign in 2006–07 and organized 'The Wave', a campaign focused on the climatic impacts of energy production which took place on 5 December 2009, in the run-up to the UN talks in Copenhagen.

The coalition encourages individuals to enact their own approaches and to lobby the government of the United Kingdom for what they see as positive policies on climate change. From 2005 to 2010, the director of the coalition was environmental campaigner Ashok Sinha. There is also a Scottish secretariat called Stop Climate Chaos Scotland.

The I Count Campaign
The I Count campaign aimed to ensure that world leaders act on rising global greenhouse gas emissions in order to keep the average global temperature increase to under 2 °C (3.6 °F) and avoid the more serious consequences of global warming.

In 2006, the campaign focused on the lead-up to the Queen's speech, urging the Government to introduce a Climate Change Bill in the forthcoming Parliamentary session, including legally binding cuts in emissions (3% per year and 50% by 2050), and an annual carbon budget.

The I Count London Climate Change Rally was a demonstration in London on November 4, 2006. It was attended by 20,000 to 25,000 people and was timed to coincide with the release of the Stern Report, calling on the government to take more serious action to prevent damage from climate change.

The event started with an initial rally at Grosvenor Square, outside the US Embassy, where George Monbiot, Caroline Lucas, and Norman Baker addressed the crowd. The rally marched to Trafalgar Square, joining an already assembled crowd. The campaign then focussed on the contents of the Climate Change Bill and criticised the initial proposals as failing to take into account the 2 °C 'global warming danger threshold'.

The Energy Campaign
At the end of 2008, with the climate change act through parliament, the coalition switched its attention to energy policy. The new campaign demands were for the government to boost investment in renewables and scrap plans for a string of coal power stations beginning with Kingsnorth. Via a pair of e-actions on their website, thousands of emails were sent to Ed Miliband, Gordon Brown and campaigners' local MPs requesting energy policy to be rethought. The coalition is also working with The Age of Stupid team on their Not Stupid campaign.

The Wave
On 5 December 2009, people from all walks of life gathered in London and Glasgow to mark the United Nations Climate Change Conference 2009 which took place in Copenhagen. The aim was to rally the British Government and other members of other parties in the United Kingdom to ‘Quit Dirty Coal’, ‘Protect the Poorest’ and ‘Act Fair & Fast’ to avoid the worst impacts of Climate Change. Reports of attendance vary from 40,000 to 60,000 people, which makes it the largest demonstration of climate change in the world to date.

Lobby of MPs
In November 2010, the coalition organised the "Big Climate Connection", a lobby of MPs regarding the Cancún climate summit and the forthcoming Energy Bill.

Members
The members of the coalition include:

Airport Watch 
A Rocha
CAFOD
Campaign against Climate Change 
Carplus
Christian Aid 
Climate Outreach and Information Network 
Come Off It
Environmental Justice Foundation
Ethical Consumer 
Friends of the Earth 
Greenpeace 
IFEES
Islamic Relief
Justice and Peace Scotland
Medact 
National Trust for Scotland
National Union of Students of the United Kingdom
Operation Noah 
Oxfam
People & Planet 
Plan B 
Practical Action 
Road Block 
RSPB 
Scottish Action on Climate Change
Save our World 
SCIAF
Shared Energy
SPEAK network
Surfers Against Sewage 
Sustrans 
Take Global Warming Seriously 
Tearfund 
The Wildlife Trusts 
Transport 2000 
UNA-UK
UK Youth Climate Coalition
UNISON 
Women's Institute 
Womens Environmental Network 
Woodland Trust 
World Development Movement 
WWF-UK
Youth Against Climate Change

See also
 A Green New Deal
 Campaign against Climate Change (pressure group)
 United Kingdom Climate Change Programme
 United Kingdom Climate Change Bill
 Action on climate change
 Global Day of Action

References

External links
Stop Climate Chaos Coalition
Stop Climate Chaos Canada

Climate change organisations based in the United Kingdom
Environmental organizations established in 2005
2005 establishments in the United Kingdom